William Lothian FRSE (1740–1783) was a Scottish minister, author and joint founder of the Royal Society of Edinburgh.

Life
He was born in Edinburgh on 5 November 1740 the son of Dr George Lothian (died 1746), a surgeon. He was educated at the High School in Edinburgh. He attended Edinburgh University studying divinity from 1755 and was licensed to preach in October 1762, aged only 21.

In 1764 he was appointed minister of Canongate Kirk on the Royal Mile and remained in that post until death.

In 1779 he received an honorary doctorate (DD) from Edinburgh University.
On 17 November 1783 he was one of the joint founders of the Royal Society of Edinburgh. He died four weeks later on 17 December 1783, making him the first member to die. He is buried in Canongate Kirkyard next to his own church. The grave lies adjacent to the eastern doorway to the lower north section.

Family
In 1766 he married a cousin, Elizabeth Lothian (died 1815) daughter of Edward Lothian an Edinburgh jeweller. They had five sons and one daughter: Edward Lothian WS (1769-1840), William (b.1770), George Lothian (b.1772) a merchant in Leith, John (1775-1779), Thomas Lothian (b.1776) a surgeon, and Helen (b.1773).

Publications
The Scotch Preacher (1776)
The History of the United Provinces of the Netherlands (1780)

References

1740 births
1783 deaths
Writers from Edinburgh
Alumni of the University of Edinburgh
Clergy from Edinburgh
Fellows of the Royal Society of Edinburgh
Scottish non-fiction writers
Burials at the Canongate Kirkyard